Freddy Alexander García Carrera (born 12 January 1977) is a Guatemalan professional footballer currently playing for Heredia in the Guatemalan third division. He has played for several local clubs since 1997, and also in Major League Soccer for Columbus Crew, where he won the 2002 Lamar Hunt U.S. Open Cup.

Also a member of the Guatemala national team, he has played in four World Cup qualifying campaigns, and is among Guatemala's all-time top scorers.

Club career
An attacking midfielder renowned for his accurate left foot, García was born in Puerto Barrios, and started his professional career with Universidad San Carlos (USAC). In 1999, he joined Comunicaciones, where he won two league titles. In 2002, he joined Columbus Crew in the MLS and played five regular season matches that year. He scored the championship-winning goal for Crew at the 2002 Lamar Hunt U.S. Open Cup Final against Los Angeles Galaxy. The following season, he appeared in 22 matches. Since 2004, he has returned to Guatemala to play for Municipal, helping that club win seven league championships. In June 2009 he left Municipal to join Heredia, going on to score 14 goals for the club in the 2009–2010 season. The following year, he played for Peñarol La Mesilla, before returning to Heredia for the 2011–12 season.

International career
García is a member of the Guatemalan national team, which he has represented during the 2002, 2006, 2010, and 2014 World Cup qualification campaigns. In 1997, he was part of the youth national team participating at the VI Juegos Deportivos Centroamericanos. He made his senior international debut in a November 1998 friendly match against Honduras

He also played futsal internationally, as he was part of his country's Futsal team competing at the 2000 Futsal World Championship which was held in Guatemala.

He made his return to the national squad in 2011 for a 2014 FIFA World Cup qualification match against Saint Vincent and the Grenadines and scored just minutes coming in as a substitute. He then scored two goals against Grenada later that year, tying Mario Camposeco for 4th place in the all-time goal scorers list for Guatemala with 23 goals.

International goals
Scores and results list Guatemala's goal tally first.

Honors

Columbus Crew
 Champion Lamar Hunt U.S. Open Cup (1): 2002

References

External links
 
 Player profile – CSD Municipal
 

1977 births
Living people
People from Puerto Barrios
Guatemalan footballers
Guatemalan expatriate footballers
Guatemala international footballers
Universidad de San Carlos players
Comunicaciones F.C. players
Columbus Crew players
C.S.D. Municipal players
Expatriate soccer players in the United States
2000 CONCACAF Gold Cup players
2001 UNCAF Nations Cup players
2002 CONCACAF Gold Cup players
2003 UNCAF Nations Cup players
2003 CONCACAF Gold Cup players
2007 UNCAF Nations Cup players
Major League Soccer players
Copa Centroamericana-winning players
Association football midfielders